Appleton is a town in Knox County, Maine, United States. It is about 15 miles inland from Penobscot Bay and coastal towns such as Camden and Rockland, about 30 miles east of the state capital of Augusta, Maine. The population was 1,411 at the 2020 census.

History
The town was incorporated on January 28, 1829 from the former Plantation of Appleton. The plantation and town was named for Nathaniel Appleton, who was for more than 20 years an officer of the Twenty Associates, the proprietors of Appleton, as well as Camden, Hope, Liberty, and Montville.

Geography

Demographics

2010 census
As of the census of 2010, there were 1,316 people, 545 households, and 362 families living in the town. The racial makeup of the town was 97.8% White, 0.5% African American, 0.2% Asian, 0.2% from other races, and 1.3% from two or more races. Hispanic or Latino of any race were 0.6% of the population.

There were 545 households, of which 30.6% had children under the age of 18 living with them, 56.9% were married couples living together, 5.7% had a female householder with no husband present, 3.9% had a male householder with no wife present, and 33.6% were non-families. 27.2% of all households were made up of individuals, and 9% had someone living alone who was 65 years of age or older. The average household size was 2.41 and the average family size was 2.95.

The median age in the town was 43 years. 23.2% of residents were under the age of 18; 5.6% were between the ages of 18 and 24; 24.3% were from 25 to 44; 34.8% were from 45 to 64; and 12.1% were 65 years of age or older. The gender makeup of the town was 51.7% male and 48.3% female.

2000 census
As of the census of 2000, there were 1,271 people, 480 households, and 346 families living in the town. There were 547 housing units at an average density of 16.7 per square mile (6.4/km2). The racial makeup of the town was 98.51% White, 0.39% African American, 0.08% from other races, and 1.02% from two or more races. Hispanic or Latino of any race were 0.63% of the population.

There were 480 households, out of which 39.6% had children under the age of 18 living with them, 62.3% were married couples living together, 6.0% had a female householder with no husband present, and 27.9% were non-families. 21.7% of all households were made up of individuals, and 7.5% had someone living alone who was 65 years of age or older.  The average household size was 2.65 and the average family size was 3.13.

In the town, the population was spread out, with 29.3% under the age of 18, 5.0% from 18 to 24, 32.7% from 25 to 44, 22.8% from 45 to 64, and 10.1% who were 65 years of age or older.  The median age was 36 years. For every 100 females, there were 98.6 males.  For every 100 females age 18 and over, there were 96.3 males.

The median income for a household in the town was $36,615, and the median income for a family was $41,731. Males had a median income of $27,065 versus $25,385 for females. The per capita income for the town was $16,484.  About 4.6% of families and 7.9% of the population were below the poverty line, including 8.4% of those under age 18 and 9.8% of those age 65 or over.

Education

Public schools:
 Appleton Village School (K–8), School Union 69
 Camden Hills Regional High School

Notable people
 Barbara Merrill, Democrat-turned unenrolled state legislator who ran for governor in 2006
 Jonathan Richman, singer, songwriter and guitarist
 Gary Sukeforth, unenrolled state legislator and grocery store owner
 Zachary Fowler, Winner of season 3 "Alone"

References

External links
Town of Appleton

Towns in Knox County, Maine
Towns in Maine